Joginder Singh may refer to:

 Joginder Singh (soldier) (1921–1962), Subedar in the Indian Army
 Joginder Singh (rally driver) (1932–2013), Kenyan former rally driver
 Joginder Singh (field hockey) (1939–2002), Indian hockey player
 Joginder Jaswant Singh (born 1945), Chief of Army Staff of India
 Tiger Joginder Singh, Indian professional wrestler
 Joginder Singh (cricketer, born 1904) (1904–1940), Indian cricketer
 Joginder Singh (cricketer, born 1980), Delhi cricketer
 Joginder Singh Dhanaor, Indian athlete
 Joginder Singh Rao (1938–1994), an Indian cricketer and former major general in the Indian Army
 Kaka Joginder Singh (1918–1998), textile owner from Bareilly